Rachel Fenwick (born 25 October 1935) is a British archer who competed for Great Britain at the 1976 Summer Olympics in Montreal. She finished 23rd in the individual event.

She continued to compete afterwards and became British Champion. She also appeared in the Guinness Book of records when she broke 6 British records in Brussels.

In October 2001, she co-founded the Wellington Bowmen archery club.

References

1935 births
Living people
British female archers
Archers at the 1976 Summer Olympics
Olympic archers of Great Britain
20th-century British women